This is the discography of Raphael Gualazzi, an Italian singer and pianist.

Studio albums

Extended plays

Singles

Music videos

Notes

References

External links
 Official website 
 Raphael Gualazzi at Allmusic

Gualazzi, Raphael